The Women's 200 metre breaststroke competition of the 2022 FINA World Swimming Championships (25 m) was held on 16 December 2022.

Records 
Prior to the competition, the existing world and championship records were as follows.

The following new records were set during this competition:

Results

Heats 
The heats were started at 11:19.

Final
The final was held at 19:42.

References

Women's 200 metre breaststroke
2022 in women's swimming